Praealticus striatus, the striated rockskipper, is a species of combtooth blenny found in the western Pacific ocean, in the South China Sea.

References

striatus
Taxa named by Hans Bath
Fish described in 1992